Peter Horry (1743 – 28 February 1815) was a planter of Huguenot descent and a South Carolina militia leader. On June 12, 1775, the Provincial Congress of South Carolina elected twenty captains to serve in the 1st and 2nd South Carolina Regiments, which on September 16, 1776, were taken on the Continental Establishment as the 1st and 2nd Regiments, South Carolina Line. Peter Horry was elected one of those captains, and receiving the fifth highest vote, was ranked fifth of the twenty and assigned to the 2nd Regiment.

Personal life
Horry was born and raised in the Prince George Winyah Parish (Georgetown, South Carolina and vicinity), as were both of his parents and all four of his grandparents. All eight of his great grandparents were French Huguenot refugees who were part of a two-wave migration, first moving from France to England and then moving from England to South Carolina.  Horry's eight great grandparents fled France in the 1670s, and all of them arrived in Charles Town, Carolina in the early 1680s.

Taught to read and write at the Indigo Society school near his home in Georgetown, Peter Horry later served a harsh apprenticeship with a local merchant. By the late 1760s Horry had established a mercantile partnership in Georgetown, which he discontinued after inheriting 475 acres from his father to become a plantation owner. He presumably thrived in this new role, as he later purchased his brother's share of his father's estate, a rice plantation called Belle Isle. Eventually Horry owned three plantations on Winyah Bay and the Santee River, as well as land in Ninety Six District and a house in Columbia (later called the Horry-Guignard House). At the time of his death he owned as many as 116 slaves.

Military service
On September 16, 1776, he was promoted to major of the 2nd Regiment, and in 1779 was promoted to lieutenant-colonel and assigned to the 5th Regiment. When the 1st, 2nd, 3rd, 5th and 6th Regiments were consolidated February 12, 1780, into three regiments he was placed upon the "supernumerary list" to await a vacancy in the rank of lieutenant-colonel in the Continental Line of South Carolina.

In July, 1780, all officers and men of the South Carolina Line not in the hands of the enemy or on parole were directed to report to General Gates' headquarters at Hillsboro, N. C. In accordance therewith Horry reported to Gates, but as he was without a command, Gates assigned him to duty with the militia of South Carolina. After the appointment of Lieutenant-Colonel Francis Marion, another officer of the South Carolina Line without a command—his regiment having been captured at the Fall of Charleston while he was on furlough—to be brigadier general of the lower brigade of the militia of South Carolina by Governor Rutledge, Horry became colonel of one of the militia regiments under Marion. Horry County, South Carolina, is named for him.

Civilian service
Peter Horry represented Prince George Winyah Parish in the state House of Representatives in 1782 and from 1792 to 1794, and in the state Senate from 1785 to 1787.

Legacy
In 1801, Horry County, South Carolina was founded and named in honor of him.  

The Horry-Guignard House, where he lived, was added to the National Register of Historic Places in 1971.

He was inducted into the South Carolina Hall of Fame in 2007.

References

 

1743 births
1815 deaths
American slave owners
Continental Army officers from South Carolina
South Carolina colonial people
South Carolina militiamen in the American Revolution
Huguenot participants in the American Revolution
Members of the South Carolina House of Representatives
South Carolina state senators